The Politburo Standing Committee (PSC), officially the Standing Committee of the Political Bureau of the Central Committee of the Communist Party of China, is a committee consisting of the top leadership of the Chinese Communist Party (CCP). Historically it has been composed of five to eleven members, and currently has seven members. Its officially mandated purpose is to conduct policy discussions and make decisions on major issues when the Politburo, a larger decision-making body, is not in session. According to the party's constitution, the General Secretary of the Central Committee must also be a member of the Politburo Standing Committee.

According to the party's Constitution, the party's Central Committee elects the Politburo Standing Committee. In practice, however, this is only a formality. The method by which membership is determined has evolved over time. During the Mao Zedong era, Mao himself selected and expelled members, while during the Deng Xiaoping era consultations among party elders on the Central Advisory Commission determined membership. Since the 1990s, Politburo membership has been determined through deliberations and straw polls by incumbent and retired members of both the Politburo and the Standing Committee.

The PSC is theoretically responsible to the Politburo, which is in turn responsible to the larger Central Committee. In practice, the Standing Committee is supreme over its parent bodies. Additionally, because China is a one-party state, Standing Committee decisions de facto have the force of law. Its membership is closely watched by both the national media as well as political watchers abroad. Historically, the role of the PSC has varied and evolved. During the Cultural Revolution, for example, the PSC had little power.

The membership of the PSC is strictly ranked in protocol sequence. Historically, the General Secretary (or Party Chairman) has been ranked first; the rankings of other leaders have varied over time. Since the 1990s, the General Secretary, President, Premier, first-ranked Vice Premier, Chairman of the National People's Congress, the Chairman of the Chinese People's Political Consultative Conference, the Secretary of the Central Commission for Discipline Inspection, the party's top anti-graft body, and the first secretary of the CCP Secretariat have consistently also been members of the Politburo Standing Committee. The portfolios of additional members varied.

Terminology 
The Politburo Standing Committee is technically responsible to the Politburo of the Chinese Communist Party. In Chinese political usage, a "Standing Committee" (常务委员会, Chángwù Wěiyuánhuì) simply refers to a body that carries out the day-to-day affairs of its parent organ, in this case, the Politburo. The Politburo, in turn, is a policy making body that is formally responsible to the larger Central Committee, which meets at plenary sessions usually once every year.

"Politburo Standing Committee" is the most commonly used name to refer to the body in English-language media. It is sometimes abbreviated PSC or PBSC (if "Politburo" is written as "Political Bureau"). It can also be referred to informally as simply the "Standing Committee". In its official English-language press releases, Chinese state media refers to the body by its lengthier, formal name, "The Standing Committee of the Political Bureau of the CCP Central Committee". In turn, its members are officially referred to as "Members of Standing Committee of the Political Bureau of the CCP Central Committee". These official forms are rarely used by English-language newspapers outside of mainland China.

In official Chinese-language announcements, the most commonly used name for members of the body is Zhōnggòng Zhōngyāng Zhèngzhìjú Chángwěi (中共中央政治局常委); this is an abbreviation of the much lengthier official title of Zhōngguó Gòngchǎndǎng Zhōngyāng Zhèngzhìjú Chángwù Wěiyuánhuì Wěiyuán (中国共产党中央政治局常务委员会委员). As even the officially abbreviated terminology may still be too lengthy and unwieldy, some media outlets refer to PSC members as Zhèngzhìjú Chángwěi (政治局常委) or simply Chángwěi (常委). Do note that without any context, Changwei may still be an ambiguous term, as provincial and local party committees all have a Standing Committee, the members of this committee can also be known as Changwei.

History

Early history 
The first Standing Committee was formed in July 1928, at a meeting of the 6th Central Committee of the Chinese Communist Party. Between January 1934 and the 1st plenary session of the 8th National Congress of the Chinese Communist Party in 1956, the Standing Committee was replaced by the Central Secretariat of the Chinese Communist Party. During the early history of the Communist Party it was seen as the highest central body that was intended to carry out day-to-day work of the Party's Central Committee. It was composed of the top leadership figures of the larger Political Bureau (i.e., the "Politburo"). Unlike most other Communist parties in the world modeled after the party of Lenin, the CCP formed a Standing Committee because the Politburo (normally the highest organ in a Communist Party) was considered too large and unwieldy to make decisions effectively.

Cultural Revolution 
In the early days of the Cultural Revolution, the Politburo Standing Committee ceased normal operations, as many of its key members, such as Chinese President Liu Shaoqi and Vice Premier Deng Xiaoping, fell out of favour with Chairman Mao. Real power was concentrated in the Cultural Revolution Group, which was nominally reporting to the Politburo Standing Committee but in fact was a separate "centre of authority" that acted mostly on its own accord. At the 9th National Congress of the Chinese Communist Party, radical supporters of Mao, Chen Boda, and Kang Sheng, gained seats on the Politburo Standing Committee, and it resumed a somewhat normal functioning. The last years of the Cultural Revolution were dominated by internal chaos. Between 1975 and 1976, PSC members Kang Sheng, Zhou Enlai, Zhu De, and Mao all died. Deng Xiaoping was purged. During this time the body lost any semblance of a functioning policy-making or executive organ, and it met only on an ad hoc basis. By Mao's death in September 1976, the only members who still attended meetings were Hua Guofeng, Zhang Chunqiao, Wang Hongwen, and Ye Jianying, with Zhang and Wang being members of the Gang of Four. On 6 October, Hua Guofeng called a PSC meeting ostensibly to discuss Mao's legacy and memorial arrangements, inviting the active PSC members to attend. Wang and Zhang were both arrested at the meeting and accused of "counter-revolutionary crimes". Thereafter, only Ye and Hua continued their official duties. A functioning PSC was not restored until 1977.

After economic reforms 
After taking power in 1978, one of the goals of Deng Xiaoping was to strengthen the power of the party and institutionalize bodies such as the Politburo and its Standing Committee. For much of the 1980s, the PSC was restored as the party's supreme decision-making body. The committee was again organized on the basis of democratic centralism, that is, decisions were to be made based on consensus, and, failing that, decisions are taken by majority vote; once a decision is taken the entire body speaks with one voice. However, the PSC competed with retired party elders (organized as the Central Advisory Commission, though they made most of their decisions informally) for influence. Deng Xiaoping himself bridged the two bodies, and his informal clout translated to great political power personally. In 1987, Deng and other party elders ousted then General Secretary Hu Yaobang from the PSC, replacing him with Zhao Ziyang. In 1989, Deng and various party elders ordered the military to intervene in the 1989 Tiananmen Square protests without gaining the consensus of the PSC. Zhao was opposed to declaring martial law and broke with other members of the PSC, notably Premier Li Peng. In the aftermath, Zhao and Hu Qili were removed from the PSC at the Fourth Plenum in 1989, largely by fiat of Deng and the elders rather than institutional procedure, to be replaced by Jiang Zemin and Li Ruihuan.

The operation of the Standing Committee has remained largely stable since Tiananmen in 1989. The 1989 Plenum was the last occasion where a major reshuffle of the PSC occurred. At the 14th Party Congress in 1992, seven people – Jiang, Li Peng, Qiao Shi, Li Ruihuan, Zhu Rongji, Liu Huaqing, and Hu Jintao – were named to the Standing Committee, this arrangement remained unchanged until the regularly scheduled 15th Party Congress in 1997, where Qiao Shi and Liu Huaqing retired and were replaced by Wei Jianxing and Li Lanqing, showing the first signs that the PSC would become a term-based body operating on a fixed schedule. Liu Huaqing was also the last PSC member with a military background. In 1999, Vice President Hu Jintao also became Vice Chairman of the Central Military Commission, as he was being groomed to succeed Jiang. This was the first time Vice President had occupied the post of Vice Chairman of the CMC.

At the 16th Party Congress held in 2002, the Standing Committee was expanded from seven to nine members. Some political observers speculated that the expansion was done in order to stack the new Standing Committee with loyalists of Jiang Zemin, though this characterization has been disputed. During Hu Jintao's term as General Secretary (2002–2012), the PSC could be understood as a "leadership collective" or a "joint presidency"; that is, essentially a body operating on consensus that executes powers normally granted to a single officeholder. The 16th Party Congress also saw Li Changchun gain a seat on the PSC without a formally defined portfolio, though he was widely considered to be the "propaganda chief". Huang Ju died in June 2007, becoming the first sitting PSC member to die in office since 1976. His vacancy was not filled ostensibly because it was only a few months preceding a Party Congress, making the body operate temporarily with an eight-member structure. The 17th Party Congress maintained roughly the same structure as the 16th.

At the 18th Party Congress held in 2012, membership of the PSC was yet again reduced to seven members. The head of the Political and Legal Affairs Commission did not feature in the new Standing Committee, neither did the vice-president. The positions of executive secretary of the Secretariat and that of "propaganda chief" were consolidated into one person, Liu Yunshan.

Contemporary selection method and considerations 
Selection of members is believed to be largely the result of high-level deliberations among incumbent members of the party's Politburo and PSC as well as retired PSC members. Prospective candidates for membership in the PSC typically rely on individual members of this high level group to act as their patrons. The current and former Politburo members conduct several rounds of deliberations interspersed with a series of straw polls to determine their support for the candidacy of new Politburo and PSC members. These straw polls are not binding and instead reflect the evolving consensus of the group on a new member's candidacy. The Politburo may also conduct a straw poll of all incumbent Central Committee members on the candidacy of new Politburo and PSC members, but this poll is only consultative. The process of selecting the new Politburo and PSC begins with a closed door session of the incumbent PSC at Beidaihe in the last summer before the Party Congress convenes in the fall. The list of Politburo and PSC candidates for the Central Committee to formally confirm is usually complete several weeks before the Party Congress.

According to informed academic observers such as Cheng Li, a scholar at Brookings Institution, and Susan Shirk of the Graduate School of International Relations and Pacific Studies, rise in the Chinese political system and selection to the Standing Committee depends more on loyalty to powerful patrons than on ability. It was widely believed, for example, that the Standing Committee line-up of the 16th Party Congress included several members who were elevated based on their relationship with outgoing General Secretary Jiang Zemin, including, most notably, Zeng Qinghong, Huang Ju, and Jia Qinglin. Much has been written on the divide between Princelings and the Tuanpai (Youth League faction) between the 16th and 18th Congresses, though it is not precisely known to what extent factional identity played in the selection of PSC members.

Seniority also played an important role. It was established convention that a member of the PSC must have served for at least one term on the Politburo prior to entry to the PSC. However, this "rule" had been broken several times by those destined for party leader or the premiership, most notably with Zhu Rongji and Hu Jintao in 1992, and Li Keqiang and Xi Jinping in 2007. Jiang Zemin was also in the middle of serving out his first term on the Politburo before he was suddenly made General Secretary and thus a member of the PSC in 1989.

Since the late 1990s, nearly all PSC members have experience as a party chief of a province or a direct-controlled municipality. Of the 29 Standing Committee members inaugurated to the body since 1997, only six individuals have not held regional party chief positions: Li Peng, Wen Jiabao, Li Lanqing, Luo Gan, Liu Yunshan, Wang Huning, and Ding Xuexiang; of these, only three – Li Peng, Wen Jiabao, and Wang Huning have never served in a regional leadership role.

Age is also key. For instance, since 1989, all Standing Committee members have been at least 50 years old at the time of their appointment. Hu Jintao was 50 upon his appointment to the PSC at the 14th Party Congress in 1992. Xi Jinping was 54 and Li Keqiang was 52 at their appointment to the PSC at the 17th Party Congress in 2007. At the same time, since the 16th Party Congress in 2002, PSC members who were 68 or older at the time of a Party Congress have retired without exception. This has been known as the rule of qi-shang, ba-xia (七上八下; lit. "seven up, eight down"), referring to the fact that if a PSC member is 68 or older at the time of a party congress, he must retire, but if he is 67 or younger, he may still enter the committee. Recently, however, doubt has been cast over this "rule". A senior party cadre named Deng Maosheng, in a statement to state-run news agency Xinhua in October 2016, stated that "The strict boundaries of 'seven up, eight down' don’t exist. This is something from folklore, and cannot be trusted."

In 2002, apart from Hu Jintao, the entire PSC retired and was replaced. Strict age-based retirement instituted in the CCP meant de facto term limits and relatively high turnover, with the vast majority of members serving for one or two terms. Since 1989, the only PSC member to have served more than three terms on the body was Hu Jintao, who served for four terms between 1992 and 2012. Policy views of ambitious aspirants are routinely concealed in order to gain the broadest level of consensus, with Hu Jintao being a prime example. Various theories have been proposed, mostly by academic outside of mainland China, to discern the 'factions' within a Standing Committee (often between "conservatives" and "reformers"), though in practice due to its opaque operations, faction membership has never been a hard-and-fast rule. Overly showy or high-profile 'campaigning' for the PSC, such as the actions of former Chongqing party secretary Bo Xilai, were considered detrimental to PSC selection.

Current members (in order) 

On 23 October 2022, the 20th PSC was elected. Four of the previous PSC members retired. Xi Jinping, Zhao Leji, and Wang Huning retained their seats.

Historical membership and rankings 

The following is a list of the historical composition of the Standing Committee since the founding of the People's Republic of China in 1949, listed by official ranking protocol. Those ranked first have held the title of Chairman or General Secretary of the Communist Party. The remaining ranks vary.

 8th PSC (elected September 1956): Mao Zedong, Liu Shaoqi, Zhou Enlai, Zhu De, Chen Yun, Lin Biao (X), Deng Xiaoping
 8th PSC (Cultural Revolution re-shuffle, elected August 1966): Mao, Lin Biao (X), Zhou Enlai, Tao Zhu, Chen Boda (X), Deng Xiaoping, Kang Sheng (X), Liu Shaoqi (R), Zhu De, Li Fuchun, Chen Yun
 9th PSC (elected April 1969): Mao, Lin Biao (D, X), Zhou Enlai, Chen Boda (X), Kang Sheng (X)
 10th PSC (elected August 1973): Mao (D), Hua Guofeng (elevated April 1976), Zhou Enlai (D), Wang Hongwen (X), Kang Sheng (D, X), Ye Jianying, Li Desheng, Zhu De (D), Zhang Chunqiao (X), Dong Biwu (D), Deng Xiaoping (elected January 1975) 
 11th PSC (elected August 1977): Hua Guofeng, Ye Jianying, Deng Xiaoping, Li Xiannian, Wang Dongxing (resigned February 1980), Chen Yun, Hu Yaobang, Zhao Ziyang (elected February 1980)
 12th PSC (elected September 1982): Hu Yaobang (removed January 1987), Ye Jianying (resigned September 1985), Deng Xiaoping, Zhao Ziyang, Li Xiannian, Chen Yun
 13th PSC (elected November 1987): Zhao Ziyang, Li Peng, Qiao Shi, Hu Qili, Yao Yilin
 13th PSC (Post-Tiananmen re-shuffle, elected June 1989): Jiang Zemin, Li Peng, Qiao Shi, Yao Yilin, Song Ping, Li Ruihuan
14th PSC (elected October 1992): Jiang Zemin, Li Peng, Qiao Shi, Li Ruihuan, Zhu Rongji, Liu Huaqing, Hu Jintao
 15th PSC (elected September 1997): Jiang Zemin, Li Peng, Zhu Rongji, Li Ruihuan, Hu Jintao, Wei Jianxing, Li Lanqing
 16th PSC (elected November 2002): Hu Jintao, Wu Bangguo, Wen Jiabao, Jia Qinglin, Zeng Qinghong, Huang Ju (D), Wu Guanzheng, Li Changchun, Luo Gan
 17th PSC (elected October 2007): Hu Jintao, Wu Bangguo, Wen Jiabao, Jia Qinglin, Li Changchun, Xi Jinping, Li Keqiang, He Guoqiang, Zhou Yongkang (X)
 18th PSC (elected November 2012): Xi Jinping, Li Keqiang, Zhang Dejiang, Yu Zhengsheng, Liu Yunshan, Wang Qishan, Zhang Gaoli
 19th PSC (elected October 2017): Xi Jinping, Li Keqiang, Li Zhanshu, Wang Yang, Wang Huning, Zhao Leji, Han Zheng
 20th PSC (elected October 2022): Xi Jinping, Li Qiang, Zhao Leji, Wang Huning, Cai Qi, Ding Xuexiang, Li Xi

Notes: 
 (D): Died in office.  
 (X): Expelled from party (including posthumously)
 (R): Expelled from the party, then rehabilitated

See also 

 Historical membership of the Politburo Standing Committee (includes list of all Standing Committee members throughout history)
 Politburo of the Chinese Communist Party
 Political position ranking of the People's Republic of China
 Politics of the People's Republic of China

Notes

References 

Standing Committee
China, Politburo of the Communist Party
Politburo
1928 establishments in China